John Emil Österholm (14 June 1896 – 19 October 1923) was a Finnish footballer and military pilot. Österholm played for HIFK Helsinki and earned four caps for the Finland national football team. Österholm scored his only international goal against Estonia in October 1920.

In the 1918 Finnish Civil War, Österholm fought for the White Guards. He took part on the capture of the icebreaker Volynets and the Battle of Helsinki. After the war, Österholm went to a military career and became a pilot in 1923. He died in October 1923 as the Finnish Air Force IVL A.22 Hansa floatplane crashed into the Gulf of Finland outside Hamina.

References 

1896 births
1923 deaths
People from Ingå
People from Uusimaa Province (Grand Duchy of Finland)
Finnish footballers
Finland international footballers
HIFK Fotboll players
Association football midfielders
People of the Finnish Civil War (White side)
Finnish aviators
Victims of aviation accidents or incidents in Finland
Aviators killed in aviation accidents or incidents
Victims of aviation accidents or incidents in 1923